Davidoff is a surname. Notable people with the surname include:

Dov Davidoff, American comedian
Leo M. Davidoff, professor at Albert Einstein College of Medicine
Monte Davidoff, American computer programmer
Paul Davidoff, planning theorist
Sidney Davidoff, American lawyer
Zino Davidoff (1906–1994), Ukraine-born Swiss tobacconist and the founder of the Davidoff cigar brand

Surnames from given names